Live in Denmark 1972 is a live album by English hard rock band Deep Purple, recorded 1 March 1972 at the K.B. Hallen in Copenhagen, Denmark, released in 2007.

The album is the Copenhagen video soundtrack of the Live in Concert 72/73 DVD.

This is one of five Deep Purple concerts released from the tours in 1972, and the only one to feature "Fireball", which was substituted with "Smoke on the Water" one week later (see Deep Purple in Concert).

Track listing
All songs written by Ritchie Blackmore, Ian Gillan, Roger Glover, Jon Lord and Ian Paice except where indicated.

Live in Denmark 1972 – Official Archive Collection (2007)

Live in Copenhagen 1972 (2013 Deep Purple (Overseas) Live Series)

Total length of the Copenhagen 1972 show: 95:34 (= 78:13 + 17:21)

Personnel
 Ritchie Blackmore – guitar
 Ian Gillan – vocals, harmonica, percussion
 Roger Glover – bass
 Jon Lord – organ, keyboards
 Ian Paice – drums, percussion

Charts

Re-release

2007 live albums
Deep Purple live albums